Spycies is a 2019 Chinese-French computer-animated spy film directed by Guillaume Ivernel and Zhiyi Zhang. It was funded by iQIYI Motion Pictures and produced by Lux Populi. The film premiered at the Annecy International Animation Film Festival in France on 14 June 2019 and at the Shanghai International Film Festival in China on 17 June 2019 (where it was nominated for Best Animated Feature) before being theatrically released in China on 11 January 2020.

Synopsis 
Special agent cat Vladimir Willis is not good at obeying orders, so he is sent on a disciplinary assignment to a remote off-shore platform to guard a top-secret cargo, accompanied with timid rookie rat Hector. But when a gang of mysterious figures break into the platform and steal the cargo, Vladimir and Hector must retrieve the cargo.

Cast 
Kirk Thornton as Vladimir, an chartreux cat who works as a secret agent the main protagonist.
Dino Andrade as Hector, a lazy but timid rat who accompanies Vladmir.
Karen Strassman as Chloe, a rabbit.
Salli Saffioti as Mia, a bee actress.
Jamieson Price as  Doc, an grizzly bear scientist and as Kotor, an elderly, hairless woolly mammoth who was rescued from extinction by Doc and plans to get revenge on him with the name of "The Demon of the Cold", the main antagonist.
Lauren Alexandre-Lasseur as Melissa, a female woolly mammoth.
Debi Derryberry as Melinda and Jim, a couple of hippopotamus, a chicken, a pig, and a giraffe.
Barbara Goodson as Antiques Sellers, a spider.
David Lodge as a frog reporter, Dr. Snub-nosed monkey, mole patient, mole doctor, an alligator, a parrot and Thunderbolt a criminal leopard.
John Hasler as Mainim, an elephant calf who is the son of Kotor and Melissa.

Production
In Dragon Hunters, director Guillaume Ivernel developed semi-realistic choices for the characters that integrated into textured and photo-realistic universes. This style offers the viewer an image at the crossroads of animation and live action.

Over 250 to 300 people worked on the film. The character designs, modelling were done in France at the Lux Populi studios in Paris using Maya software. With some parts of the rendering being done at another studio in Paris the Les Androids Associés. Parts of the screenplay was designed by the French team, with the film's animation being done back in France at Jungler along with the modeling of some characters, in China, Lux Populi's facilities in Beijing did the rest alongside the post production.

Release 
Spycies premiered at the Annecy International Animation Film Festival in France on 14 June 2019 and at the Shanghai International Film Festival in China on 17 June 2019, before being theatrically released in China on 11 January 2020. It grossed 128 million yuan, becoming the second highest-grossing animated film of 2020 in China and the seventeenth highest-grossing animated film in China overall.

Critical reception 
The film received generally positive reviews in China, but received more negative reviews internationally. On review aggregator Rotten Tomatoes, the film holds an approval rating of  based on  critical reviews.

See also 
List of Chinese animated films

References

External links 

2019 animated films
2019 films
French animated feature films
2019 computer-animated films
2010s adventure films
2010s spy comedy films
French computer-animated films
Chinese animated films
Films about prejudice
French children's films
Animated films about animals
Chinese children's films
French multilingual films
Chinese multilingual films
Anime-influenced Western animation
2010s English-language films
2010s French films